"Full Measure" is the thirteenth episode and season finale of the third season of the American television crime drama series Breaking Bad, and the 33rd overall episode of the series. It was written and directed by the show's creator and executive producer Vince Gilligan.

It originally aired on AMC in the United States on June 13, 2010.

Plot 
In a flashback to 1993, Walter White and his pregnant wife Skyler are shown by a realtor the house where they will eventually live. Walt, then working at the prestigious Sandia Laboratory, envisions a bright future with three children and worries that they are not setting their sights high enough with the "starter house".

In the present day, after Walt kills the gang members and Jesse Pinkman goes on the run, Walt meets with Gus Fring and Mike to negotiate for his and Jesse's safety, and for the continuation of his employment. Walt suggests Gus has two options: (A) kill Walt right there on the spot and eventually track down and kill Jesse, or (B) consider the incident a "lone hiccup in an otherwise long and fruitful business arrangement," let him return to cooking, and both agree to forget about Jesse. Gus leaves, appearing to have chosen option B but informs Walt that he will be choosing Jesse's replacement.

Walt arrives at the superlab. Gale Boetticher has been reinstated as his lab partner, and Victor now shadows them everywhere. Gus informs Gale later that night of Walt's cancer. Gus says he intends to keep Walt on as long as possible but must prepare for the "worst-case scenario." Walt, whose prior suspicions about Gale are soon reignited, correctly concludes that Gus is simply grooming Gale and that Walt will be killed once Gale masters Walt's cooking procedure.

Acting on Gus's request, Mike visits Saul Goodman to find out Jesse's whereabouts. Saul refuses, claiming attorney-client privilege, but relents after Mike physically threatens him. Saul then allows Mike to look at a notebook containing a fake address for a trailer park in Virginia.

Walt and Saul meet Jesse at a laser tag arcade; Victor is parked nearby and watches Walt and Saul enter. Walt informs Jesse of his situation and explains that when Gale is confident enough to take over, they will be disposed of. Walt decides they must kill Gale. Jesse begs Walt, having made enough money from the venture to ensure his family is financially secure, to quit and go to the police or the Drug Enforcement Administration, but Walt refuses. He reasons that Gus cannot stop production, and with Gale out of the picture, Gus would have no choice but to keep Walt. Jesse says he is not a murderer and cannot kill Gale. Walt says he will do the job, and Jesse only needs to find Gale's address, as Walt is being heavily watched and cannot do so. Later that evening, Jesse calls Walt at home with Gale's address.

As Walt is leaving his home to kill Gale, Victor arrives and informs him of a chemical leak at the lab. Walt suspects a setup but is forced to go with Victor. Upon arriving at the laundromat, Walt sees Mike, confirming his suspicions. Pleading for his life, Walt offers to cook for free and take them to Jesse. Mike, upon hearing this, demands Jesse's location, but Walt says he needs to call him and set up a meeting. Walt calls Jesse, who is sitting in the darkened laser tag building about to smoke meth. Jesse asks "Did you do it?" Walt frantically tells Jesse he is about to be killed. He urges Jesse to reach Gale and kill him first. Victor and Mike wrestle the phone away and when Walt quotes Gale's address to them, they realize what he has asked Jesse to do. Victor hurriedly leaves; Mike stays with Walt and attempts to warn Gale, but Gale fails to notice his phone ringing. Jesse arrives at Gale's house and pulls a gun on him. Gale pleads for his life, but a tearful and shaking Jesse reluctantly pulls the trigger.

Production 
The episode ends with Jesse's pulling a gun on Gale and firing directly into the screen, with Gale's death not visibly revealed on-screen. This led to wide speculation among fans and reviewers that Jesse did not actually kill Gale, but rather aimed away from him and fired the gun. However, Gilligan said he never intended for that scene to be a cliffhanger and he thought it clearly conveyed that Gale had died.

Reception 
Upon first initial airing, the episode was watched by 1.56 million American viewers, and attained an 18–49 rating/share of 0.7/2.

Bryan Cranston won his third consecutive Primetime Emmy Award for Outstanding Lead Actor in a Drama Series for his performance in this episode.

Critical reaction to the episode was overwhelmingly positive, with many reviewers calling it one of the best in the series. Tim Goodman of the San Francisco Chronicle praised the season's character development, describing the finale as "an exclamation mark on the tortured journey of Jesse". Maureen Ryan of the Chicago Tribune believed the episode "mixed action with character beats well." Donna Bowman of The A.V. Club stated the episode "should cement this season of Breaking Bad as one of television's finest dramatic accomplishments". Seth Amitin of IGN gave the episode a 9, saying that "[it] wasn't the best episode this season, but it was still a good one and we got to know more about the rest of the players."

The finale of the episode (and season), where Jesse Pinkman hesitantly shoots Gale point-blank, was critically acclaimed. Stephen Lagioia, writing for Screen Rant, said the moment was a pivotal one for Jesse's character development, calling the scene "a pretty somber and disturbing moment." Being called one of the saddest, and most shocking deaths in the series by various critics, Amanda Harding said Gale's death was a turning point in Jesse's and Walter's relationship, and also said the ending further moved Walter into becoming his darker persona, Heisenberg.

In 2019 The Ringer ranked "Full Measure" as the second best out of the 62 total Breaking Bad episodes.

References

External links 
 

2010 American television episodes
Breaking Bad (season 3) episodes
Television episodes directed by Vince Gilligan
Television episodes written by Vince Gilligan